Tregonan may refer to:

Tregonan Grange
Otto Tregonan